Edoardo Zardini (born 2 November 1989) is an Italian former racing cyclist, who competed as a professional from 2013 to 2022. Zardini won stage 3 of the 2014 Tour of Britain with a breakaway ascent of The Tumble in Monmouthshire and also became the new race leader.

Major results

2009
 9th Cronoscalata Gardone Val Trompia — Prati di Caregno
2010
 4th Trofeo Zsšdi
 9th Overall Girobio
2011
 4th Trofeo della Luganega di Palù
2012
 3rd Overall Giro del Friuli-Venezia Giulia
 6th Overall Girobio
 9th Piccolo Giro di Lombardia
2013
 4th Overall Danmark Rundt
 6th Giro dell'Emilia
2014
 1st Stage 2 Giro del Trentino
 4th Overall Tour of Britain
1st Stage 3
 4th Giro dell'Emilia
 8th Tre Valli Varesine
2015
 8th Giro dell'Appennino
 9th Giro dell'Emilia
 10th Overall Giro del Trentino
2016
 8th Gran Premio della Costa Etruschi
2018
 4th Overall Tour of Antalya
 7th Overall Czech Cycling Tour
2019
 4th Overall Tour de Hongrie
2020
 9th Overall Tour of Antalya
2022
 7th Overall International Tour of Hellas

Grand Tour general classification results timeline

References

External links

1989 births
Living people
Italian male cyclists
Sportspeople from Verona
Cyclists from the Province of Verona